"Trombone Dixie" is an instrumental by the American rock band the Beach Boys that was composed by Brian Wilson, although nobody from the group played on the recording. Wilson produced the instrumental in November 1965, early in the sessions for the band's album Pet Sounds (1966). It was left off the album and was not released until 1990 as a bonus track for the CD reissue of Pet Sounds. Excerpts from the instrumental's recording session were then included for The Pet Sounds Sessions (1997).

According to Brian, "I was just foolin' around one day, fuckin' around with the musicians, and I took that arrangement out of my briefcase and we did it in 20 minutes. It was nothing, there was really nothing in it." The piece reprises a riff from Wilson's "The Little Girl I Once Knew" (1965), and a portion of the intro would later be recycled for his "Had to Phone Ya" (1976).

Personnel
Per Alan Boyd and Craig Slowinski.

Cover versions

 2012 – Superimposers, MOJO Presents Pet Sounds Revisited

References

The Beach Boys songs
Songs written by Brian Wilson
Song recordings produced by Brian Wilson
1965 songs
1960s instrumentals